Lobogonodes taiwana is a moth in the family Geometridae first described by Alfred Ernest Wileman and Richard South in 1917. It is found in Taiwan.

References

Moths described in 1917
Cidariini
Moths of Taiwan